Max Eugen Keller (born March 19, 1947, Aarau) is a Swiss composer, jazz pianist and improvising musician. He was one of the first free-jazz musicians in Switzerland. Since 2007 he is chairman of the Swiss Society for New Music.

Life and work 
Keller studied (fellowship by the Heinrich Strobel Foundation in Freiburg, Germany) musicology, history and composition with Hans Ulrich Lehmann and Helmut Lachenmann at the City of Basel Music Academy and with Nicolaus A. Huber and Thomas Kessler.

In 1966 he began his career as one of the first Swiss artists of free jazz. In 1967, he had a sensational performance at the Zurich Jazz Festival. He played in various bands in concerts and on radio broadcasts in Europe.

Since 1980 he worked as an improvising musician (piano and electronic musical instruments) again. Concerts have taken him to South America, Germany, the Netherlands and Switzerland. He worked together with Dani Schaffner, Christoph Gallio, Peter A. Schmid, Kurt Grämiger, Daniel Mouthon, Thomas Borgmann, Hans Koch, Urs Leimgruber, Günter Müller, Hans Hassler, Charlotte Hug, Matthias Ziegler, Christian Wolfarth, Günter Heinz and Barry Guy.

He has composed about 100 works, including electronic music. He produce a chamber opera (commission of the Komische Oper Berlin) and several songs. His compositions have been performed in Europe, Australia, South Africa, North and South America, Russia, Korea, China, Mongolia and Azerbaijan (including the World Music Days in Zurich (1991) and Mexico (1993)). Performers were the Orchester Musikkollegium Winterthur, the Tonhalle Orchester Zürich, the Ensemble Sortisatio and the Hanns Eisler New Music Group.

From 2007 to 2010 he is chairman of the Swiss Society for Contemporary Music (successor to  Jean-Luc Darbellay).

Awards 

 1997: Carl Heinrich Ernst Art Prize
 2006: Art Prize of Winterthur

External links
 
 Homepage of Max E. Keller
 Biography of Max E. Keller at Musinfo
 Information about Max E. Keller at Klassika
 Information about Max E. Keller at the Living Composers Project

References

1947 births
Living people
Swiss classical composers
Swiss jazz pianists
Free improvising musicians
21st-century classical composers
20th-century classical composers
Swiss male classical composers
Male pianists
21st-century pianists
20th-century male musicians
21st-century male musicians
Male jazz musicians
20th-century Swiss composers
21st-century Swiss composers